"The truth will set you free" (Latin: Vēritās līberābit vōs (biblical) or Vēritās vōs līberābit (common), Greek: ἡ ἀλήθεια ἐλευθερώσει ὑμᾶς, trans. hē alḗtheia eleutherṓsei hūmâs) is a statement which derives from John 8:32 in which Jesus Christ addressed a group of Jews who believed he was the messiah.

Translations 
The verse from the King James Version of the bible: "And ye shall know the truth and the truth shall make you free" is carved in stone in the Original Headquarters Building (OHB) of the Central Intelligence Agency.

The phrase is used as motto by many universities, colleges, and schools: Yonsei University, Caltech (semi-officially), Johns Hopkins University, Our Lady Seat of Wisdom College, Canterbury Christ Church University, University of Portland, Idaho State University, Ottawa University, St. Augustine's University, Southern Methodist University, University of Tennessee, Lafayette College, St Thomas College, Thrissur, Mar Ivanios College, Andhra Christian College, Catholic University of Uruguay, Catholic University of Cordoba, University of San Martín de Porres, Doshisha University, Victoria University, and Darien High School.

The verse itself, "Ye shall know the truth and the truth shall make you free," is inscribed on the Main Building at the University of Texas at Austin and at Parks Library at Iowa State University. "The truth shall make you free" is also inscribed on "Old Vic," the Victoria College building at Victoria University in the University of Toronto.

Translated into German, Die Wahrheit wird euch frei machen ("The truth will make you free"), it is the motto of the Albert Ludwig University of Freiburg.

Usage 
The phrase is in the bible on the coat of arms of the Dominican Republic.

The former president of Brazil, Jair Bolsonaro, commonly uses the phrase, which was his motto at the 2018 presidential election. After the Johnny Depp v. Amber Heard verdict on June 1, 2022, Depp tweeted the versicle.

References

Further reading

External links 
 

Gospel of John
Johns Hopkins University
Latin mottos
Latin religious words and phrases
Latin words and phrases
Sayings of Jesus
Truth
Vulgate Latin words and phrases